A pinfold was a structure into which straying animals were placed until they were retrieved by their owner on payment of a fine.  Other terms for the structure were penfold or pound.  These names were derived from the Old English words pund (pound) and fuld (fold).  In Cheshire, most of these were square or circular stone structures, although there is a circular pinfold in Henbury.  There is evidence of the existence of at least 153 pinfolds in Cheshire, although, as of 2010, only eight of these remain in the current county of Cheshire.  There are also the remains of four other pinfolds in the county.

Key

References

Bibliography

External links

Agricultural buildings in England
 
Buildings and structures used to confine animals
Lists of buildings and structures in Cheshire